Anton Vyacheslavovich Bagayev (born 11 June 1979) is a former Russian professional football player.

Club career
He played in the Russian Football National League for FC Irtysh Omsk in 2010.

Honours
 Russian Second Division Zone East top scorer: 2008 (14 goals).

Personal life
He is the younger brother of Andrei Bagayev.

References

External links
 

1979 births
Living people
Russian footballers
Association football forwards
FC Irtysh Omsk players